Events from the year 1842 in Denmark.

Incumbents
 Monarch – Christian VIII
 Prime minister – Otto Joachim, Poul Christian Stemann

Events

Births
 4 February – Georg Brandes, critic and scholar (died 1927)
 27 February  Theodor Wessel, businessman (died 1905)
 2 March – Carl Jacobsen, brewer, industrialist and arts patron (died 1914)
 17 August – Hugo Egmont Hørring, politician, prime minister of Denmark (died 1909)
 16 November – Hannibal Sehested, prime minister of Denmark (died 1924)

Deaths
 8 October – Christoph Ernst Friedrich Weyse, composer (born 1774)

References

 
1840s in Denmark
Denmark
Years of the 19th century in Denmark